Workplace spirituality or spirituality in the workplace is a movement that began in the early 1920s.  It emerged as a grassroots movement with individuals seeking to live their faith and/or spiritual values in the workplace.  Spiritual or spirit-centered leadership is a topic of inquiry frequently associated with the workplace spirituality movement.

History

The movement began primarily as U.S. centric but has become much more international in recent years.  Key organizations include:

  International Center for Spirit at Work (ICSW)
  European Baha'i Business Forum (EBBF)
  World Business Academy (WBA)
  Spiritual Business Network (SBN)
  Foundation for Workplace Spirituality

Key factors that have led to this trend include:

  Mergers and acquisitions destroyed the psychological contract that workers had a job for life.  This led some people to search for more of a sense of inner security rather than looking for external security from a corporation.
  Baby Boomers hitting middle age resulting in a large demographic part of the population asking meaningful questions about life and purpose.
  The millennium created an opportunity for people all over the world to reflect on where the human race has come from, where it is headed in the future, and what role business plays in the future of the human race.

In the late 1990s, the Academy of Management formed a special interest group called the Management, Spirituality and Religion Interest Group.  This is a professional association of management professors from all over the world who are teaching and doing research on spirituality and religion in the workplace.

Theories
Different theories over the years have influenced the development of workplace spirituality.
Spiritual Leadership Theory (2003): developed within an intrinsic motivation model that incorporates vision, hope/faith, and altruistic love
Social Exchange Theory (1964): which attempts to explain the social factors which affect the interaction of the person in a reciprocal relationship
Identity Theory (1991): claims a connection between workplace spirituality and organizational engagement

Examples

The International Center for Spirit at Work offers examples of workplace spirituality including:
 "Vertical" spirituality, transcending the day-to-day and developing connectedness to a god or spirit or the wider universe.  This might include meditation rooms, accommodation of personal prayer schedules, moments of silence before meetings, retreats or time off for spiritual development, and group prayer or reflection.
 "Horizontal" spirituality, which involves community service, customer service, environmentalism, compassion, and a strong sense of ethics or values that are reflected in products and services.

See also
Benefit corporation
Dominic Steele, ministry includes workplace Bible groups
Swami sukhabodhananda, nicknamed "the Corporate Guru"
John Sentamu, advocate for faith in the workplace
Workplace Religious Freedom Act, 2005 US bill requiring employers to make reasonable accommodation for an employees' religious practice or observance
A Practical Reference to Religious Diversity for Operational Police and Emergency Services

References

Sources
 Benefiel, M. (2005). Soul at work: Spiritual leadership in organizations. New York: Seabury Books. 
 Biberman, J. (Ed.).(2000). Work and spirit: A reader of new spiritual paradigms for organizations. Scranton, PA: University of Scranton Press. 
 Bowman, T.J. (2004). Spirituality at Work: An Exploratory Sociological Investigation of the Ford Motor Company. London School of Economics and Political Science
 Fairholm, G.W. (1997). Capturing the heart of leadership: Spirituality and community in the new American workplace. Westport, CT: Praeger. 
 Fry, L.W. (2005). Toward a paradigm of spiritual leadership. The Leadership Quarterly, 16(5), 619-722.
 Giacalone, R.A., & Jurkiewicz, C.L. (2003). Handbook of workplace spirituality and organizational performance. New York: M.E. Sharpe. 
 Jue, A.L. (2006). Practicing spirit-centered leadership: Lessons from a corporate layoff. In Gerus, C. (Ed.). Leadership Moments: Turning points that changed lives and organizations. Victoria, BC: Trafford. 
 Miller, D.W. (2006). God at work: The history and promise of the faith at work movement. New York: Oxford University Press. 
 Palmer, Parker J. (2000) Let Your Life Speak: Listening for the Voice of Vocation. San Francisco: Jossey-Bass. Ch 5 "Leading from Within." . 
 Russell, Mark L., ed. (2010). Our Souls at Work: How Great Leaders Live Their Faith in the Global Marketplace. Boise: Russell Media. 
 Marques, Joan, Dhiman, Satinder,  and King, Richard, ed. (2009) The Workplace and Spirituality:  New Perspectives on Research and Practice  SkyLight Paths, Woodstock, VT.
 N.T., Sree Raj. (2011). Spirituality in Business and Other Synonyms: A Fresh Look at Different Perspectives for its Application, 'Purushartha' A Journal of Management Ethics and Spirituality Vol.IV, No.II, pp 71–85
 Mitroff, I.I, and Denton, E.A. (1999) A Spiritual Audit of Corporate America, A Hard Look at Spirituality, Religion, and Values. San Francisco: Jossey-Bass.

Further reading

 Business Week, June 5, 2005.  "Companies hit the road less traveled:  Can spirituality enlighten the bottom line?"

External links
Spirituality in the Workplace - The Living Organization
 Catholic Servant Leadership
 Foundation for Workplace Spirituality
 Global Dharma Center
 International Center for Spirit at Work
 The High Calling of Our Daily Work
 Theology of Work Project
 Seven Principles of Spirituality in the Workplace
 Faith and Work Initiative
 www.theologyofwork.org
 Denver Institute for Faith & Work

Philosophical schools and traditions
Spirituality
Positive mental attitude
Organizational culture
Industrial and organizational psychology
Workplace